Eta Ursae Minoris, Latinized from η Ursae Minoris, is a yellow-white hued star in the northern circumpolar constellation of Ursa Minor. 

This is an F-type main-sequence star of stellar classification F5 V with an apparent magnitude of +4.95, making it faintly visible to the naked eye. Based upon an annual parallax shift of 33.4 mas as seen from the Earth, it is located 98 light years from the Sun. The star is moving closer to the Sun with a radial velocity of −11 km/s, and is traversing the sky with a relatively high proper motion of 0.271 arc seconds per year.

Eta Ursae Minoris is about one billion years old and has an estimated 1.35 times the mass of the Sun. It has a high rate of spin with a projected rotational velocity of 84.8 km/s. Eta Ursae Minoris may form a wide binary system with a magnitude 15.3 companion star, located at an angular separation of 228.5 arc seconds.

In some Arabic star charts it is labeled انور الفرقدين ʼanwar al-farqadayn, "the brighter of the two calves", and paired with ζ Ursae Minoris as اخفي الفرقدين akhfā al-farkadain "the dimmer of the two calves". The names may originally refer to a pair of Ibexes, and are more properly applied to β UMi and γ UMi respectively, the brighter two stars in the rectangle of Ursa Minor.

References

F-type main-sequence stars
Ursae Minoris, Eta
Ursa Minor (constellation)
Durchmusterung objects
Ursae Minoris, 21
148048
079822
6116